The Shoemaker and the Doll is a 1913 American silent short drama film starring William Garwood.

External links

1913 films
1913 drama films
Silent American drama films
American silent short films
American black-and-white films
1913 short films
Fiction about shoemakers
Fictional dolls and dummies
1910s American films